Glyceria grandis is a species of grass known by the common name American mannagrass. It is native to Canada and the United States, where it is widespread in distribution. It is most commonly found in wet areas such as riverbanks and ponds.

Description
This is a rhizomatous perennial grass bearing thin stems which approach two meters in maximum height. The sturdy leaves each have a prominent central vein. The tops of the stems are occupied with spreading, multibranched inflorescences bearing many small, oval-shaped spikelets.

References

External links 
 Jepson Manual Treatment
 USDA Plants Profile
 Photo gallery

grandis
Freshwater plants
Grasses of the United States
Grasses of Canada
Native grasses of California